D62 may refer to:
 D62 steam locomotive 
 HMS Khedive (D62), a 1942 British Royal Navy escort aircraft carrier
 HMS Jutland (D62), a 1946 British Royal Navy Battle-class fleet destroyer
 HMS Wild Swan (D62), a 1919 British Royal Navy V and W class of destroyer
 , a 1995 Indian Navy Delhi-class destroyer
 D62 road (Croatia), a state road

and also:
 D 62, Nad Al Hammar Road, a road in Al Rashidiya, Dubai Emirate, United Arab Emirates
 the ICD-10 code for an acute posthaemorrhagic anaemia